The Kugarak River is a stream,  long, in the northwestern part of the U.S. state of Alaska.

Its Inuit name was first reported in 1886 by U.S. Navy Lieutenant Stoney, who spelled it as "Kue-ga-rack". It was first spelled as "Kugarak" in 1901 by U.S. Geological Survey. The name was also spelled as "Koogarak" and "Kuegerak".

See also
List of rivers of Alaska

References

Rivers of Alaska
Rivers of Northwest Arctic Borough, Alaska
Rivers of Yukon–Koyukuk Census Area, Alaska
Rivers of Unorganized Borough, Alaska